Kastriot or Kastrioti may refer to:

Kastriot or Kastrioti, an Albanian name for Obilić, a town and municipality in central Kosovo
Kastriot, Albania or Kastrioti, a village and municipality in north-eastern Albania
Kastriot (name), an Albanian masculine given name
Kastrioti, an Albanian royal and noble family
Principality of Kastrioti, a principality in medieval Albania